Bonnie Jo Campbell (born September 14, 1962 in  Kalamazoo, Michigan) is an American novelist and short story writer. Her most recent work is Mothers, Tell Your Daughters, published with W.W. Norton and Company.

Life and work
Campbell attended Comstock High School (from which she graduated in 1980), and received a B.A. in philosophy from the University of Chicago in 1984. From Western Michigan University, she received an MA in mathematics in 1995 and an MFA in creative writing in 1998. She has traveled with the Ringling Brothers and Barnum and Bailey Circus, and has organized adventure bicycle tours in Eastern Europe and Russia.

Campbell teaches fiction at Pacific University in Forest Grove, Oregon, in the low-residency MFA program. Campbell lives in Kalamazoo, Michigan, with her husband, Christopher Magson.

Her stories and essays have appeared in Ontario Review, Story, The Kenyon Review, Witness, The Alaska Quarterly Review, Michigan Quarterly Review, Mid-American Review, and Utne Reader. In 1999, her story "Shifting Gears" was the official story of the Detroit Automobile Dealers' Association Show. 
Campbell's literary work has been recognized and highlighted at Michigan State University at their Michigan Writers Series.

She was a finalist for the 2009 National Book Award in fiction for her short-story collection American Salvage, which the Kansas City Star also named a Top Six Book of 2009. American Salvage was also a finalist for the National Book Critics Circle Award for fiction.  She has won a Pushcart Prize for her story "The Smallest Man in the World," the 1998 Associated Writing Programs Award for short fiction (for Women & Other Animals), and the 2009 Eudora Welty Prize from Southern Review for "The Inventor, 1972."

In 2009, her manuscript "Love Letters to Sons of Bitches" won the Center for Book Arts' Poetry Chapbook Competition.

Works

Short story collections
; Simon & Schuster, 2002, 
; W. W. Norton, 2009,

Novels

Once Upon a River, W. W. Norton & Company, 2011,

Poetry Chapbooks
Love Letters to Sons of Bitches, Center for Book Arts, 2009

Notes

External links 
Bonnie Jo Campbell's Official Website
Profile on National Book Foundation Website
 Los Angeles Times Review
 NPR Book Review
 Interview with Kenyon Review
 Wisconsin Book Festival 2009 Interview
 Author Bonnie Jo Campbell on fizzy water, donkeys

Novelists from Michigan
American women short story writers
Pacific University faculty
Living people
American women novelists
20th-century American short story writers
20th-century American women writers
21st-century American short story writers
21st-century American novelists
21st-century American women writers
People from Kalamazoo, Michigan
University of Chicago alumni
Western Michigan University alumni
1962 births
Novelists from Oregon
American women academics